Tropical Storm Earl caused minor damage in the Windward Islands in mid-August 2004. The fifth tropical cyclone and named storm of the annual hurricane season, Earl developed on August 13 from a tropical wave centered well east of the Lesser Antilles. The depression gradually organized as it tracked west-northwestward and was upgraded to Tropical Storm Earl roughly a day after genesis. As the system approached the Windward Islands it continued to slowly strengthen, peaking as a 50 mph (85 km/h) tropical storm early on August 15. However, the system unexpectedly degenerated into a tropical wave that afternoon, likely due to its fast forward motion. The remnants of Earl continued across the Caribbean Sea and eventually re-developed into Hurricane Frank in the eastern Pacific Ocean on August 23.

Gusty winds in Grenada damaged at least 34 roofs and knocked down twelve trees and six electrical poles. Additionally, a nursing home on the island was evacuated due to significant structural damage. Two houses lost their roofs in Saint Vincent and the Grenadines, while moderate crop damage was reported on the island. Downed trees and power lines in Tobago left 90% of the island without electricity. Overall, Earl was responsible for one fatality, nineteen missing, and an unknown amount of damage.

Meteorological history

The formation of Tropical Storm Earl is attributed to a low-latitude, vigorous tropical wave that emerged off the western coast of Africa and into the eastern Atlantic Ocean on August 10. As the disturbance moved towards the west, satellite imagery revealed a much better structure with much-improved banding features and fair upper-level outflow, leading to the formation of Tropical Depression Five at 1800 UTC on August 13, situated roughly 1000 mi (1610 km) east of the Lesser Antilles. The depression progressed rapidly towards the west-northwest the following day, embedded and under the influence of a deep easterly flow around the southern periphery of a subtropical ridge to the cyclone's north. A combination of improved banding features and satellite intensity estimates by the afternoon of August 14 led to the subsequent upgrade of the system to Tropical Storm Earl. At this time, the cyclone was situated about 325 mi (525 km/h) east of Barbados.

Within an environment characterized by low wind shear, high atmospheric humidity, and warm sea surface temperatures, Earl intensified, reaching a peak intensity of 50 mph (85 km/h) by 0600 UTC on August 15. Initial forecasts from the National Hurricane Center depicted gradual intensification into a powerful hurricane as the system entered the central Caribbean Sea, but these forecasts were lowered in later advisories. Despite an impressive satellite presentation associated with Earl as it passed through the southern Leeward Islands, a hurricane hunter flight reported that the system no longer had a low-level circulation late on August 15. As a result, the NHC discontinued advisories on the system and declared it an open tropical wave. While not entirely sure, it is suspected that the fast motion of the cyclone attributed to its dissipation. The remnant wave eventually entered the eastern Pacific Ocean, developing into Hurricane Frank by August 23.

Preparations, impact, and aftermath
Following the development of Tropical Storm Earl, tropical storm watches were issued for Barbados, St. Vincent, and St. Lucia. This watch was modified to a tropical storm warning by August 14 at 2100 UTC, with the addition of the islands of the Grenadines, Trinidad, Tobago, and Grenada. The tropical storm warning for Barbados was changed to a tropical storm watch the following day at 1200 UTC, and all tropical cyclone watches and warnings were discontinued by 1800 UTC. In preparation of the storm, several hundred people in Grenada evacuated from low-lying areas to schools set up as shelters. Shopkeepers boarded windows, while airports were temporarily shut down across the Leeward Islands. Initial forecasts predicted that Earl would strengthen considerably into a hurricane and head towards Florida once in the Caribbean Sea, a state already impacted heavily earlier in the month by Hurricane Charley. The local officials urged residents to exercise caution, but not panic due to the large errors in long-range forecasts. These warnings eased upon the system's degeneration into an open tropical wave.

In Grenada, Earl produced heavy rains and strong winds that caused moderate damage. On the main island, roofs were blown off twelve homes while three others were partially damaged; twelve trees and six power poles were also knocked down by the winds. The heavy rain associated with the tropical storm triggered nine mudslides and three rockslides on the island. Nearby, six homes had their roofs completely blown off while thirteen others were damaged. Flooding was also reported on both islands; however, no known damage resulted from them. During the storm, a nursing home had to be evacuated due to significant damage to the structure. On St Vincent and the Grenadines, at least two homes had their roofs blown off and banana crops sustained moderate damage. In Tobago, numerous trees and power lines were downed throughout the island, cutting power to 90% of the island. The highest surface sustained winds in relation to Earl occurred on the morning of August 15 in Barbados and St. Lucia; winds were reported at 35 mph (55 km/h). One person was killed by the storm and nineteen others were listed as missing.

Following the storm, Grenada requested assistance from the United States Agency of International Development. Local crews worked quickly to cover broken roofs and repair other structural damage. The National Emergency Relief organization were sought for assistance.

See also

 Other storms of the same name
 Hurricane Emily (2005)
 Tropical Storm Danielle (1986)
 Tropical Storm Bret (2017)
 Hurricane Frank (2004)

References

Earl
Earl (2004)
Earl (2004)
2004 in Grenada
Earl